{{Automatic taxobox
|image=Tetraria octandra - Flickr - Kevin Thiele (1).jpg
|image_caption=Tetraria octandra
|taxon=Tetraria
|authority=P.Beauv.
|subdivision_ranks=Species
|subdivision=
|synonyms_ref=
|synonyms=
Aulacorhynchus Nees
Boeckeleria T.Durand
Decalepis Boeckeler
Elynanthus Nees
Ideleria Kunth
Lepisia C.Presl
Macrochaetium Steud.
Schoenopsis P.Beauv. ex T.Lestib.
Sclerochaetium Nees
Tetrariopsis C.B.Clarke
Trichoballia C.Presl
}}Tetraria is a genus of flowering plants in the sedge family, Cyperaceae, native to Tanzania, South Africa, Borneo, Australia and New Zealand.

The type species is Tetraria compar (L.) P.Beauv.

Recent molecular work has shown that Tetraria is polyphyletic and in need of revision.

DescriptionTetraria''' are perennial herbs, with generally few nodes. The leaves are conspicuously sheathed with flat or incurved blades. The inflorescence is usually a narrow panicle, with the flowers being bisexual, the lower flowers being male, and there are generally three stamens and three stigmas. The fruit (a nutlet) is generally trigonous and often retains its style as a beak or crown.

List of species
(Accepted by Plants of the world online)Tetraria australiensis C.B.ClarkeTetraria borneensis J.KernTetraria bromoides (Lam.) H.Pfeiff.Tetraria burmanni (Vahl) C.B.ClarkeTetraria capillacea (Thunb.) C.B.ClarkeTetraria capillaris (F.Muell.) J.M.BlackTetraria capitata Kük.Tetraria compar (L.) B.D.Jacks.Tetraria compressa TurrillTetraria crinifolia (Nees) C.B.ClarkeTetraria cuspidata (Rottb.) C.B.ClarkeTetraria eximia C.B.ClarkeTetraria fasciata (Rottb.) C.B.ClarkeTetraria ferruginea C.B.ClarkeTetraria fimbriolata (Nees) C.B.ClarkeTetraria flexuosa (Thunb.) C.B.ClarkeTetraria fourcadei Turrill & SchönlandTetraria involucrata (Rottb.) C.B.ClarkeTetraria ligulata (Boeckeler) C.B.ClarkeTetraria macowaniana B.L.BurttTetraria maculata Schönland & TurrillTetraria microcarpa S.T.BlakeTetraria microstachys (Vahl) H.Pfeiff.Tetraria mlanjensis J.RaynalTetraria nigrovaginata (Nees) C.B.ClarkeTetraria octandra (Nees) Kük.Tetraria picta (Boeckeler) C.B.ClarkeTetraria pillansii LevynsTetraria pleosticha C.B.ClarkeTetraria pubescens Schönland & TurrillTetraria pygmaea LevynsTetraria robusta (Kunth) C.B.ClarkeTetraria scariosa Kük.Tetraria secans C.B.ClarkeTetraria spiralis (Hochst.) C.B.ClarkeTetraria sylvatica (Nees) C.B.ClarkeTetraria thermalis (L.) C.B.ClarkeTetraria triangularis (Boeckeler) C.B.ClarkeTetraria usambarensis K.Schum.Tetraria ustulata (L.) C.B.ClarkeTetraria vaginata'' Schönland & Turrill

References

External links

 CYPERACEAE interactive identification keys @ LSU Herbarium

 
Cyperaceae genera